Richard Weil (1876 – November 17, 1917) was an American physician and cancer researcher.

Early life and education 
Weil was the son of Leopold Weil and Martha Tanzer. A native of New York City, he graduated from Columbia College in 1896, before completing his MD degree at Columbia in 1900. After completing his residency at the German Hospital in Manhattan, he went to Europe to pursue postgraduate research at Vienna and Strasbourg.

Medical career 
Weil served as part of the medical staff of numerous hospitals, including the German Hospital, Montefiore, Mt. Sinai, and General Memorial. He joined the staff of Cornell University Medical College in 1905, receiving a faculty appointment in 1911, and becoming the chair of the Department of Experimental Medicine in 1916.

Weil's primary research interest was cancer. He was part of the staff of the Huntingdon Fund for Cancer Research from 1906 until his death, and was one of the founders of the American Association for Cancer Research and the Journal of Cancer Research (for which he was the editor-in-chief). He was a councilor of the AACR in 1914, and president of the American Association of Immunologists in 1916–17. One of his major medical contributions was the demonstration that blood treated with anti-coagulants could be refrigerated, which ultimately led to the establishment of blood banks. One of his articles on anaphylaxis was the first article to be published in the Journal of Immunology.

Military service and death 
With the American entry into World War I, Weil joined the military. After training at Fort Benjamin Harrison, he was detailed as the chief of medical staff at Camp Wheeler. He held this position only a short time; he contracted pneumonia and died on November 17, 1917.

Personal life 
Weil married Minnie Straus, daughter of Isidor and Ida Straus, on May 30, 1904, at the Straus villa. They had three children: Everlyn, Richard, and Frederick Peter. His son, Richard Jr., was president of Macy's.

References 

1876 births
1917 deaths
Deaths from pneumonia in Georgia (U.S. state)
American pathologists
American medical researchers
Cornell University faculty
20th-century American physicians
Columbia College (New York) alumni
Straus family
Columbia University Vagelos College of Physicians and Surgeons alumni
19th-century American businesspeople
United States Army personnel of World War I
United States Army officers